Mimechthistatus yamahoi is a species of beetle in the family Cerambycidae, and the only species in the genus Mimechthistatus. It was described by Mitono in 1943. It was found in Taiwan.

Description
This long horned beetle is grey with a large black spot on the upper portions of the elytra. The antennae are longer than the body.

References

Phrissomini
Beetles described in 1943